Shaukat Khanum Memorial Cancer Hospital and Research Centre (abbreviated as SKMCH&RC/SKMCH) is a cancer centre with locations in Lahore and Peshawar,  Pakistan. It is the first project of the Shaukat Khanum Memorial Trust, a charitable organization established under the Societies Registration Act XXI of 1858 of British India. It is Pakistan's largest tertiary care hospital.

History
The hospital was founded by Imran Khan, Pakistani cricketer-turned-politician and former Prime Minister. The inspiration to build a cancer hospital came after his mother, Mrs. Shaukat Khanum, succumbed to cancer in 1985. During his mother's illness, he also witnessed the plight of poor cancer patients in Pakistan's hospitals, and deeply felt the need for a specialized cancer centre in his country. He had a vision of making cancer treatment accessible to every Pakistani who needed it. This is reflected in the hospital's mission statement:
 
"To act as a model institution to alleviate the suffering of patients with cancer through the application of modern methods of curative and palliative therapy irrespective of their ability to pay, the education of health care professionals and the public and perform research into the causes and treatment of cancer".[14]

Designing and execution of the master plan was overseen by Dr. Nausherwan K. Burki (MB, PhD, FRCP, FCPS, FCCP) of the University of Kentucky Medical Center, Lexington, Kentucky, in collaboration with an international team of cancer physicians and research workers. Designing and architectural services were provided by Arrasmith, Judd & Rapp, Architects in Health Planning of Louisville, Kentucky, USA. Architectural details were handled by Messrs. Nayyar Ali Dada & Associates of Lahore. Local engineering was performed by Messrs. Progressive Consultants, Lahore. The hospital land was state owned land and the use was approved by Former Prime Minister Nawaz Sharif. Ground was broken in April 1991 and the Former Prime Minister Sharif attended the opening ceremony on 29 December 1994.

Since its opening, Shaukat Khanum Memorial Cancer Hospital, Lahore has received local and international recognition, including the Joint Commission International's Gold Seal of Approval and the World Health Organization's UAE Foundation Prize.

In 1992, Bollywood legend Amitabh Bachchan, Mick Jagger of The Rolling Stones, Peter Gabriel, Vinod Khanna, Elizabeth Hurley, and Nusrat Fateh Ali Khan came together for the Shaukat Khanum Appeal Concert. In the 1990s, Diana, Princess of Wales, visited the hospital alongside her friend Jemima Khan and her two sons.

Celebrity support for Shaukat Khanum has continued through the years. Notable Pakistani actor Fawad Khan dedicated his debut Bollywood film Khoobsurat to the foundation. Each year, SKMCH&RC carries out two major cancer awareness campaigns: the Breast Cancer Awareness Campaign in October; and the Anti-Tobacco Campaign in May.

SKMCH&RC in Lahore and Peshawar provide financially supported treatment to about 75% of their patients.

Today, the Shaukat Khanum Memorial Trust has a presence in over fifty Pakistani cities in the form of hospitals, diagnostic centres, walk-in-clinics (cancer screening centres), and collection centres. The Trust aims to build a series of hospitals in various cities of Pakistan to bring cancer care closer to patients. Since a quarter of the patients at SKMCH&RC, Lahore were from the Khyber Pakhtunkhwa (KPK) province of Pakistan, and adjoining areas, the second hospital has been built in Peshawar, the capital city of Khyber Pakhtunkhwa.

The second hospital was inaugurated on 29 December 2015 by a cancer patient in Peshawar.[15] At the completion of Phase I, it has commenced clinical services, with outpatient clinics, inpatient beds, a fully equipped intensive care unit (ICU), a full-service pharmacy, and 24-hour emergency services. Chemotherapy services are also available, of tremendous benefit to patients who previously made physically, emotionally, and financially demanding trips to Lahore for cyclical chemotherapy treatments every few weeks.

In conjunction with the commencement of clinical services, the full range of pathology and radiology services have begun in Peshawar. The Radiology department has commenced services. Surgical oncology services are expected to start in 2020 as part of Phase 3 of the development. SKMCH&RC, Peshawar is built according to the latest international healthcare standards and its covered area is even bigger than SKMCH&RC, Lahore.

Board of governors
The hospital is a project of the Shaukat Khanum Memorial Trust, a non-profit legal entity established under the laws of Pakistan. The Board of Governors formulates overall policy and consists of bankers, researchers, businessmen, and physicians. The hospital is managed by a professional team from clinical, administrative, and nursing backgrounds.  former Prime Minister of Pakistan Imran Khan is the chairman of the board.

The Board of Governors of SKMT is composed of eminent individuals from diverse backgrounds, including bankers, researchers, businessmen, and physicians, who bring valuable experience to the table. The role of the Board includes governance and oversight of the clinical programmes, finances, and resource generation.
Mr. Imran Khan (chairman),
Dr. Nausherwan Khan Burki,
Mrs. Aleema Khanum,
Dr. Uzma Ahad,
Mr. Ashiq Hussain Qureshi,
Dr. Tauseef Ahmed,
Mr. Saifuddin Zoomkawala,
Mr. S.M. Muneer,
Mr. Munir Kamal,
Mr. Irfan Mustafa,
Mr. Tariq Shafi,
Mr. Ehsan Mani,
Mr. Atif Bukhari.

Clinical departments
 Surgical Oncology
 Anesthesiology Details
 Medical Oncology
 Pediatric Oncology
 Pharmacy Details
 Clinical & Radiation Oncology
 Nuclear Medicine Details
 Pathology Details
 Ancillary Health Services
 Clinical Radiology
 Internal Medicine

Research
Research is needed to develop better ways of detecting and treating cancer and to improve cancer care. Over the coming years, SKMCH&RC's expanding knowledge of cancer genetics will have a major impact on its ability to predict an individual's level of risk of developing cancer, to detect and diagnose cancer early, and to select treatments that are most likely to be effective. Ultimately, the genetic revolution may lead to ways of preventing cancer. The genetic revolution provides major opportunities for identifying people at risk of cancer and for developing better treatments. At the moment such studies are limited in Pakistan.

SKMCH&RC's research is organized in three streams: 
 Epidemiology, which seeks to understand the lifestyle and environmental causes of cancer
 Molecular biology, which will enable the development of better ways of predicting treatment responses and disease outcome i.e. molecular markers
 Clinical trials, which are primarily focused on the evaluation of existing and new therapies.

The Management Information Systems (MIS) Department has developed a state-of-the-art hospital information system. Through this system, the research team has been able to handle the logistics of a large hospital, documenting a wealth of patient information.

SKMCH&RC's objective is to explore the bridge between laboratory and clinic through the support of translational studies in areas of diagnosis, prognosis, and treatment. It is important to maintain research concerned with cancer in the local population, addressing issues of prevention through studies on the effects of genetic make-up, environment, and lifestyle.

The research section has been developed over the last five years and, recently, received a donation to refurbish the third floor of the hospital into a research wing, housing a suite of research laboratories, a data management and epidemiology division, as well as a clinical research section responsible for clinical trials.

The team of researchers is expanding and several projects are underway. Currently, Basic Sciences Research is divided into three main areas of interest and several projects are being conducted:

Identification of genetic risk factors in the development of cancer

 Prevalence and spectrum of BRCA1/2 germline mutations in Pakistani Breast and/or Ovarian Cancer families.
 A study to evaluate the association between germline genetic variation and disease risk and outcome in ovarian carcinoma in Pakistan.
 The role of p53 mutations in the development, progression and outcome of breast cancer in Pakistan.
 Genetic causes of colorectal cancer in the Pakistani population.

Tumor virology

 Human Papillomavirus Associated with Esophageal Cancer in Pakistan - A Retrospective Analysis.
 Human Papillomavirus in Cervical Cancer cases from Pakistan.
 Transcriptional profiling of Hodgkin's Lymphoma; relationship to Epstein-Barr virus status, histological subtype and geographical locale.

Infections and cancer

Quantitative PCR for detection and quantification of fungal infections in patients with acute myeloid leukemia (AML), acute lymphoblastic leukemia (ALL) and myelodysplastic syndrome.

Future
A new branch of Shaukat Khanum Memorial Hospital is planned for Karachi and is currently being built and is projected to be completed by 2023.

Shaukat Khanum Memorial Hospital is planned for Bahawalpur. Memorandum of Understanding has been signed by Shokat Khanum Memorial Hospital Lahore and Defence Housing Authority Bahawalpur on 26 July 2019. It will be built in DHA Bahawalpur on area of 400 Kanal. It is assumed that it will be Pakistan's largest cancer hospital.

Recent Achievement 
Shaukat Khanum Memorial Cancer Hospital & Research Center, Peshawar branch, has now earned Joint Commission International's Gold Seal of Approval® for Hospital Accreditation after strictly following compliance with its standards which are recognized globally.

Regional Offices

Shokat Kanum Memorial Cancer Hospital and Research Center has regional offices throughout Pakistan, in Lahore, Karachi, Islamabad, Peshawar, Multan, Faisalabad and Sialkot.
 
It has overseas offices in England, the United States, Canada, Australia, the United Arab Emirates and Norway.

Criticism
There have been some allegations of misuse of funds by Shaukat Khanam Memorial Cancer Hospital, such as siphoning off some funds for the political party Pakistan Tehrik e Insaf, being also run by the founder of SKMCH. SKMCH has denied these allegations.

See also
 List of hospitals in Pakistan
 Imran Khan
 Cancer
 Gambat

References

External links
 

Hospital buildings completed in 1994
Cancer hospitals in Pakistan
Cancer organisations based in Pakistan
Hospitals in Lahore
Hospitals established in 1994
Imran Khan
Medical research institutes in Pakistan
Nayyar Ali Dada buildings and structures
1994 establishments in Pakistan
United Arab Emirates Health Foundation Prize laureates